Agona is a small town in Ghana. It is the capital of Sekyere South District.

Populated places in the Ashanti Region